Adriana "Adri" Jacoba Pieck (1894-1982) was a Dutch artist.

Biography 
Pieck was born on 29 April 1894 in the Scheveningen section of The Hague. Her sister Margaretha "Gretha" Pieck (1898-1920) was a painter, as was her cousin Anton Franciscus Pieck (1895-1987). She attended the Rijksakademie van beeldende kunsten in Amsterdam. Her teachers included her father,  (1865-1925) , . 

Gretha and Adri exhibited together and shared a studio until Gretha's early death from Spanish influenza in 1920.

Her work was included in the 1939 exhibition and sale Onze Kunst van Heden (Our Art of Today) at the Rijksmuseum in Amsterdam.

Pieck died in Hollandsche Rading on 5 April 1982.

References

External links
Adri Pieck and her Surroundings on the Online Museum de Bilt

Further reading
Depenbrock, E. (1983) Het Leven En Werken Van Gretha En Adri Pieck (The Life and Works of Gretha and Adri Pieck), Holkema & Warendorf. 

1894 births
1982 deaths
Artists from The Hague
20th-century Dutch women artists